Antonio Falconio (26 May 1938 – 22 December 2021) was an Italian politician. A member of the Christian Democracy party and later the Italian People's Party, he served in the Chamber of Deputies from 1979 to 1983 and was President of Abruzzo from 1995 to 2000.

Falconio died on 22 December 2021, at the age of 83.

References

1938 births
2021 deaths
Christian Democracy (Italy) politicians
Deputies of Legislature VIII of Italy
People from Abruzzo
Presidents of Abruzzo